Ms. Ma, Nemesis is a South Korean television series starring Yunjin Kim, Jung Woong-in, Ko Sung-hee and CNU. The series aired four consecutive episodes on Saturday on SBS TV from October 6 to November 24, 2018.

Aside from the title story "Nemesis", the plot of the show also adapts other Christie stories, most notably "The Moving Finger", "The Mirror Crack'd from Side to Side", "A Murder is Announced" and "The Body in the Library".

Synopsis
Ms. Ma is sent to jail after being accused of killing her daughter. She escapes in order to find the real murderer and starts solving other  cases.

Cast

Main
 Yunjin Kim as Ma Ji-won
 A mystery writer.
 Jung Woong-in as Han Tae-kyu
 A detective in charge of Ms. Ma's case.
 Ko Sung-hee as Seo Eun-ji
 A woman who introduces herself as Ms. Ma's niece and then living at her house. 
 Choi Kwang-je as Ko Mal-koo
 A retired gangster who works as a loan creditor.

Recurring
 CNU as Bae Do-hwan
 A young police officer stationed at the village where Ms. Ma and Eun-ji currently staying.
 Myung Gye-nam as Jang Il-koo
 Song Young-kyu as Jang Cheol-min
 Kim Young-a as Yang Mi-hee
 Sung Ji-ru as Jo Chang-gil
 Moon Hee-kyung as Madame Park
 Hwang Suk-jung as CEO Oh
 Yoon Hae-young as Lee Jung-hee
 Lee Ye-won as Jang Min-seo
 Ms. Ma's deceased daughter.
 Choi Seung-hoon as Choi Woo-joon
 Lee Myung-hoon as Heo Joo Yeong

Original soundtrack

Part 1

Part 2

Part 3

Part 4

Part 5

Part 6

Ratings
In the table below,  represent the lowest ratings and  represent the highest ratings.

Awards and nominations

Notes

References

External links 
 
 

Seoul Broadcasting System television dramas
2018 South Korean television series debuts
Korean-language television shows
South Korean mystery television series
2018 South Korean television series endings
Television shows based on works by Agatha Christie